Rodney Clive Ketels (born 11 November 1954) Ketels represented counties at provincial level on 173 occasions from 1974 to 1987 3rd on the all-time list of games played for the union Ketels was a member of the champion Counties NPC team in 1979. 
Ketels was selected for the All Blacks for the 1978 UK grand slam tour but was unable to travel due to injury. He went on to make 16 appearances for the All Blacks and played a total of 212 first class matches.

References

1954 births
Living people
New Zealand rugby union players
New Zealand international rugby union players
Counties Manukau rugby union players
Rugby union props
People from Papakura
People educated at Pukekohe High School
Rugby union players from Auckland